Patrick Hamilton Pope (March 17, 1806 – May 4, 1841) was a U.S. Representative from Kentucky.

Born in Louisville, Kentucky, Pope attended the common schools and graduated from St. Joseph's College, Bardstown, Kentucky. He studied law. He was admitted to the bar in 1827 and commenced practice in Louisville. He declined the position of Secretary of State tendered by Gov. John Breathitt in 1832.

Pope was elected as a Jacksonian to the Twenty-third Congress (March 4, 1833 – March 3, 1835). He was an unsuccessful candidate for reelection in 1834.

Pope was elected a member of the Kentucky House of Representatives in 1836. He resumed the practice of law. He died in Louisville on May 4, 1841, and was interred in Cave Hill Cemetery.

References

1806 births
1841 deaths
Burials at Cave Hill Cemetery
Members of the Kentucky House of Representatives
Politicians from Louisville, Kentucky
Jacksonian members of the United States House of Representatives from Kentucky
19th-century American politicians